Gieboldehausen is a municipality in the district of Göttingen, in Lower Saxony, Germany. It is situated on the river Rhume, approx. 25 km northeast of Göttingen, and 15 km south of Osterode am Harz. It is part of the Eichsfeld.

Gieboldehausen is also the seat of the Samtgemeinde ("collective municipality") Gieboldehausen.

References

Göttingen (district)